First Ladies National Historic Site is a United States National Historic Site located in Canton, Ohio. During her residency in Washington, D.C. Mary Regula, wife of Ohio congressman Ralph Regula, spoke regularly about the nation's first ladies. Recognizing the paucity of research materials available she created a board to raise funds and for a historian to assemble a comprehensive bibliography on American first ladies. From these inspirations came a National First Ladies’ Library, established in 1996, and the First Ladies National Historic Site.
The site was established in 2000 to commemorate all the United States first ladies and comprises two buildings: the Ida Saxton McKinley Historic Home and the Education & Research Center. The act that established this site was at the 106th Congress meeting at the second session. The act to establish this site was bundled under other laws and is known as an omnibus. The purpose of the site is to inform the public about the influences that the First ladies of the United States had on the public and to the president, to teach the public about their contributions, and to not be remembered as just the wives of the President of the United States. 
Tours start at the Education & Research Center, located one block north of the Saxton McKinley house on Market Avenue. The 1895 building, formerly the City National Bank Building, was given to the National First Ladies’ Library in 1997.

The first floor features a theater, a large exhibit and meeting space and a small library room with a collection of books that replicates First Lady Abigail Fillmore's collection for the first White House Library. The center's second floor is home to the main National First Ladies' Library. Other floors contain conference rooms, storage and office space.

The Ida Saxton McKinley Historic Home preserves the home of Ida McKinley, the wife of U.S. president William McKinley. The brick Victorian house, built in 1841 and modified in 1865, is furnished in the style of the Victorian era. Costumed docents provide tours, and exhibits focus on President and Mrs. McKinley, photos of first ladies, and Victorian decorations.

Admission to the First Ladies National Historic Site, which is free, includes the exhibits in the Education & Research Center, and for a nominal fee, a guided tour of the Ida Saxton McKinley Historic Home is available.

The site is operated by the National First Ladies' Library in a partnership agreement with the National Park Service and managed by Cuyahoga Valley National Park.

Regional affiliation and superintendents 
The site is being managed by the Cuyahoga Valley National Park, and thus its superintendent is the same. The first superintendent who oversaw the site was:

 John Debo - Was the superintendent for Cuyahoga Valley National Park from 1988 to 2009. Since the site's creation in the year 2000, he was also the superintendent for the First Ladies National Historic Site.
 Craig Kenkel - After John Debo's retirement from the superintendent position, it would be another five years before the position would be filled. Craig Kenkel was the superintendent for this site from the year 2014 to 2020 before he would be appointed to another national park as their superintendent.
 Lisa Petit - The current superintendent for the First Ladies National Historic Site. She was first named Deputy Superintendent of the park by Craig Kenkel and promoted to the Superintendent position after Kenkel left.

Maintenance cost issues 
Since its creation in the year 2000, the historic site has faced many problems. The maintenance cost was estimated in 2014 at $220,000 for a complete restoration. That figure kept climbing until the year 2017 when it needed 1,017,000. The cost decreased down to $882,000 in 2018.

See also
Bibliography of United States presidential spouses and first ladies

References

External links

First Ladies National Historic Site
National First Ladies' Library

Biographical museums in Ohio
Buildings and structures in Canton, Ohio

Historic house museums in Ohio
History of women in Ohio
Homes of first ladies of the United States
Houses on the National Register of Historic Places in Ohio
Libraries in Ohio
Museums in Stark County, Ohio
National Register of Historic Places in Stark County, Ohio
National Historic Sites in Ohio
Presidency of the United States
Protected areas established in 2000
National Park Service areas in Ohio
Women's museums in the United States
Houses in Stark County, Ohio
2000 establishments in Ohio
Houses completed in 1841